The 2010 AFC Challenge Cup was the third edition of the tournament which was held from 16–27 February 2010 in Sri Lanka.  India, the defending champions, fielded their under-23 team for this tournament in preparation for the 2010 Asian Games later that year.  The champions, North Korea, qualified for the 2011 Asian Cup.

Qualification

The finals saw three automatic qualifiers joined by five teams from the qualification phase.  Qualification consisted of two sections.
 A playoff between the 19th and 20th ranked entrants (Mongolia and Macau)
 Four qualification groups for four teams.  Each group winner advanced to the finals, along with the best-ranked runner-up. Because of the withdrawal of Afghanistan the ranking of second-placed teams was excluded results of any matches against fourth-placed sides.

Qualifiers
Qualifiers for the final tournament were:
  (Automatic Qualifier)
  (Automatic Qualifier)
  (Automatic Qualifier)
  (Winner Qualification Group A)
  (Winner Qualification Group B)
  (Winner Qualification Group C)
  (Winner Qualification Group D)
  (Best Runner-up)

The draw for the final tournament was held on 30 November 2009 at the Galadari Hotel in Colombo, Sri Lanka.

Venues

Match officials
The following referees were chosen for the 2010 AFC Challenge Cup.

Squads

Group stage
All times are Sri Lanka Time (SLT) – UTC+5:30

Tie-breaking criteria
Where two or more teams end the group stage with the same number of points, their ranking is determined by the following criteria:
 points earned in the matches between the teams concerned;
 goal difference in the matches between the teams concerned;
 number of goals scored in the group matches between the teams concerned;
 goal difference in all group matches;
 number of goals scored in all group matches;
 kicks from the penalty mark (if only two teams are level and they are both on the field of play);
 fewer yellow and red cards received in the group matches;
 drawing of lots by the organising committee.

Group A

Group B

Knockout stage

Semi-finals

Third place match

Final

Winner

Awards

Goalscorers
4 goals
 Ryang Yong-gi

3 goals
 Choe Chol-man

2 goals

 Pai Soe
 Choe Myong-ho
 Pak Song-chol
 Fatkhullo Fatkhuloev
 Numonjon Hakimov
 Yusuf Rabiev
 Ibrahim Rabimov
 Mämmedaly Garadanow

1 goal

 Enamul Hoque
 Mohamed Zahid Hossain
 Atiqur Rahman Meshu
 Denzil Franco
 Ildar Amirov
 Anton Zemlianuhin
 Kyaw Thiha
 Myo Min Tun
 Tun Tun Win
 Yan Paing
 Kim Seong-yong
 Pak Kwang-ryong
 Ri Chol-myong
 Philip Dalpethado
 Chathura Gunarathna
 Shafraz Kaiz
 S. Sanjeev
 Arslanmyrat Amanow
 Begli Nurmyradow
 Berdi Şamyradow
 Didargylyç Urazow

Notes

References

External links
AFC Challenge Cup 2010 at The-AFC.com

 
2010
2010 in Asian football
2010
2009–10 in Sri Lankan football
2009–10 in Indian football
2010 in Tajikistani football
2010 in Burmese football
2010 in Bangladeshi football
2010 in North Korean football
2010 in Kyrgyzstani football
2010 in Turkmenistani football
February 2010 sports events in Asia